Kalyani, previously known as  Poornitha, is an Indian film and television actress. She has acted in more than 300 advertisements as a child artist.

Life

Kalyani married a doctor, Rohit based in Bangalore on 12 December 2013.

Filmography

Television

Notes

References
 

Indian child actresses
Indian film actresses
Indian television actresses
20th-century Indian actresses
21st-century Indian actresses
Living people
Actresses in Telugu cinema
Actresses in Malayalam cinema
Actresses in Tamil cinema
Actresses from Bangalore
Child actresses in Kannada cinema
Actresses in Tamil television
1990 births